Little Hippo is an animated children's television series based on the French Petit Potam books by Christine Chagnoux. The series debuted on France 3 in France on 1 September 1997. Little Hippo is produced by Marina Productions, France 3, and Eva Entertainment in France, ZDF in Germany, Neurones in Belgium, and Britt Allcroft Productions in the United Kingdom.

Premise
Little Hippo is about Little Hippo, Tessie, Tim, and Tam who live in Muddy Wallow.

Characters
Little Hippo
Tessie
Tim
Tam

Episodes

Broadcast
Little Hippo was broadcast circa 1998 on Disney Channel in the United Kingdom.

Film
Petit Potam – Le film is a film based on the series.

References

External links

 on Tiji

1997 Belgian television series debuts
1997 French television series debuts
1997 German television series debuts
1990s French animated television series
Belgian children's animated fantasy television series
British children's animated fantasy television series
French children's animated fantasy television series
German children's animated fantasy television series
French-language television shows